Frederick Lambart may refer to:
 Frederick Lambart, 8th Earl of Cavan (1815–1887)
 Frederick Lambart, 9th Earl of Cavan (1839–1900), Irish soldier and politician
 Rudolph Lambart, 10th Earl of Cavan (Frederick Rudolph Lambart, 1865–1946), British Army officer